Halobrecta is a genus of rove beetles in the family Staphylinidae. There are about six described species in Halobrecta.

Species
These six species belong to the genus Halobrecta:
 Halobrecta algae (Hardy, 1851)
 Halobrecta algophila (Fenyes, 1909)
 Halobrecta discipula Pace, 1999
 Halobrecta flavipes Thomson, 1861
 Halobrecta halensis Mulsant & Rey, 1873
 Halobrecta princeps (Sharp, 1869)

References

Further reading

External links

 

Aleocharinae
Articles created by Qbugbot